Åke Herman Gottfrid Bergman (26 May 1896 – 27 February 1941) was a Swedish swimmer. He competed at the 1912 Summer Olympics in the 100 m backstroke event, but failed to reach the final.

Bergman lived with his parents Anders and Berta near a public bath, where he started training in swimming. He later also played water polo, but lost vision in one eye after an injury during a competition. He was a hatter by profession, as his father owned a hat factory, and had a daughter Karin.

References

1896 births
1941 deaths
Olympic swimmers of Sweden
Swimmers at the 1912 Summer Olympics
Swedish male backstroke swimmers
Sportspeople from Malmö
20th-century Swedish people